Penre was an ancient Egyptian official of the New Kingdom, in office under the ruling queen Hatshepsut (about 1508–1458 BC). Penre was viceroy of Kush. The writing of his name varies on the monuments between Penre (Panre), Pare and Payre. Because of his high titles, he was  one of the most important officials at the royal court, ruling the Nubian provinces. Kush is the Ancient Egyptian name for Nubia. 

Penre was little known till his tomb at Thebes was recently excavated by a Hungarian mission. On the canopic jars found in the tomb bears the titles first king's son (= viceroy) and overseer of the southern foreign countries. Otherwise he is also known from several statue fragments. His father was called Sekheru, who also bore the title king's son. Penre was in office between the reigning year 2 of Hatshepsut, when a certain Seni was still in office, and year 18, when Inebny/Amenemnekhu is attested in that office. None of his monuments are dated, but one of his statues found in Nubia, must have been installed before the sole reign of Thutsmosis III. His burial is a shaft tomb, little survive from the tomb chapel, that was made of mud brick. The shaft was more than 11 meters deep. In the burial chamber at the bottom of the shaft were found the human remains of three adults and two children. Several objects of the burial equipment survived. They report the names Sennefer, Siamun and Penre. The fragments of the four canopic jars were still bearing Penre's name and titles. Items in the tomb include specifically prepared funerary items, objects of daily life, professional equipment and containers of provisions.

References 

Viceroys of Kush
Officials of the Eighteenth Dynasty of Egypt
Ancient Egyptian overseers of foreign lands